BCA Study Abroad (founded as Brethren College Abroad) began in 1962 as a non-profit provider of academic, language, and cultural immersion studies for undergraduates from a consortium of colleges and universities.

Origins
BCA was founded in 1962 by Morley J. Mays. In 2002 it moved its central office from North Manchester, Indiana, to Elizabethtown, Pennsylvania.

Colleges of the Brethren 
 Bethany Theological Seminary
 Bridgewater College
 Elizabethtown College
 Juniata College
 Manchester University
 McPherson College
 University of LaVerne

Peace and Justice Lecture Series 
BCA created a lecture series centered on peace, justice, indigenous rights and the environment. The lecture series ran from 2003-2005.

 2003: Professor Michael McDaniel, Director of the Department of Indigenous Studies, Macquarie University (currently he is Pro Vice-Chancellor of Indigenous Leadership and Engagement and Director of Jumbunna Institute for Indigenous Education and Research at the University of Technology Sydney; Dr. Anita Heiss, indigenous author and activist.
 2004: Dr. Ferenc Miszlivetz, director of the Institute of Advanced Studies Kőszeg (Hungary) and a Jean Monnet professor.
 2005: Dr. William Schabas, Professor Emeritus at the Irish Centre for Human Rights at the National University of Ireland, Galway.

References

External links
 BCA Official Site 

Peace and conflict studies
Student exchange
International college and university associations and consortia
Universities and colleges affiliated with the Church of the Brethren
Organizations established in 1962
Educational organizations based in the United States